Ranga is a 1982 Indian Tamil-language action film starring Rajinikanth, Raadhika and K. R. Vijaya. Produced by Thevar Films, the film was directed by R. Thyagarajan and was the 75th film of Rajinikanth as an actor. It was released on 14 April 1982 and emerged a box office success.

Plot 
Ranganathan is a young man who lost his sister Laksmi in childhood and has come to the city searching for work suitable for his graduation. There, he meets Raju, a thief. Ranga advises Raju to give up his life of crime and be a good man, whilst Raju simultaneously advises Ranga to turn to crime. After going their separate ways, both men end up taking each other's advice and change, Raju turning over a new leaf and Ranga going the other way and becoming a hit man for hire.

Laksmi is now married to a wealthy man and with a child called Suresh. Raju, who had changed comes across Suresh and saves him from a local thug. Laksmi decides to keep Raju as a guardian for Suresh to keep him safe from danger. Ranga has taken a contract from Ganga (Raadhika) to collect money from the local gang leader Ravi. However, Ravi invites Ranga to join his gang, which is declined by Ranga, who states that he does not work for any gang, but is ready to do anything given enough money.

Ranga's first assignment with Ravi is to kidnap Suresh so they can threaten his parents for money. Ranga kidnaps Suresh, who is then saved by Raju. Raju does not know that it is Ranga who came to kidnap Suresh as Ranga was in disguise. Ranga realises it was Raju and he comes to meet Raju. Raju's joy knows no bounds as he meets Ranga and tells him that he works as a guardian for Suresh. Raju also introduces Laksmi to Ranga. Not knowing that Ranga is her brother and a hit man, she agrees to keep Ranga as another guardian for Suresh. Ranga reveals his true nature to Raju that he is the one who attempted to kidnap Suresh. Raju advises Ranga to give up his criminal life and be loyal to Laksmi. Ranga however is determined to kidnap Suresh and also challenges Raju, that he will chase him out and finish his task, which he does. But Ravi double crosses Ranga and reveals to him that Laksmi is his sister. Ranga is caught by Ravi's thugs, but Raju comes to the rescue and saves Ranga. Ravi is thrown in jail, Ranga reunites with his sister and he, Ganga and Raju all lead a happy life.

Cast 
 Rajinikanth as Ranganathan ("Avasara Adi" Ranga)
 Raadhika as Ganga
 K. R. Vijaya as Laksmi
 "Karate" Mani as Raju
 Raveendran as Ravi
 Silk Smitha as Ravi's girlfriend
 Thengai Srinivasan
 Asokan
 A. R. Srinivasan
Master Haja Sheriff as Suresh

Production 
Ranga is Rajinikanth's 75th film as an actor. The film was produced by C. Dhandayudhapani under the banner Thevar Films. Thooyavan wrote the dialogues while story was provided by the story unit of Thevar Films itself. The role of the title character's sister was originally offered to J. Jayalalithaa. She accepted the offer as she liked the character very much. However, due to the interference of M. G. Ramachandran, then the chief minister of Tamil Nadu, she was not cast in the film. Ramachandran suggested K. R. Vijaya as the replacement and she was cast.

Soundtrack 
The music was composed by Shankar–Ganesh, with lyrics by Vaali. Shankar–Ganesh later adapted "Toothpaste" as "Nija Heluvenu Amma" for the Kannada film Chakravyuha (1983). The highlight of the album was the disco song "Pattukottai Ammalu".

Release and reception 
Ranga was released on 14 April 1982 and emerged a box office success. Kalki gave it the verdict, "Top Rajini formula".

References

External links 
 

1980s Tamil-language films
1982 action films
1982 films
Films directed by R. Thyagarajan (director)
Films scored by Shankar–Ganesh
Indian action films